St. Ursula Academy may refer to the following Catholic girls college preparatory schools in the United States:

St. Ursula Academy (Cincinnati, Ohio)
St. Ursula Academy (Toledo, Ohio)